Robert Alcock (died 1583), of Canterbury and Marden, Kent, was an English politician.

He was a Member of Parliament (MP) for Canterbury in 1563 and 1571.

References

Year of birth missing
1583 deaths
People from Canterbury
English MPs 1563–1567
English MPs 1571
People from Marden, Kent